"I Can't Get Next to You" is a 1969 No. 1 single recorded by the Temptations and written by Norman Whitfield and Barrett Strong for the Gordy (Motown) label. The song was a No. 1 single on the Billboard Top Pop Singles chart for two weeks in 1969, from October 18 to October 25, replacing "Sugar, Sugar" by the Archies and replaced by "Suspicious Minds" by Elvis Presley. The single was also a No. 1 hit on the Billboard Top R&B Singles for five weeks, from October 4 to November 1, replacing "Oh, What a Night" by the Dells, and replaced by another Motown song, "Baby I'm For Real" by the Originals.

The single was the second of the Temptations' four No. 1 hits on the United States pop charts, and was also one of the best-selling singles the group released. Billboard ranked it as the No. 3 song for 1969.

The applause that starts the song, which is cut short by Dennis Edwards' spoken "Hold it, hold it, listen" line, was sampled in another Temptations song "Psychedelic Shack".

Overview
"I Can't Get Next to You" was the second single from the 1969 Temptations LP Puzzle People, with "Running Away (Ain't Gonna Help You)", a ballad led by Paul Williams, as the b-side. The single was a No. 1 hit on both the Billboard Hot 100 chart and the Billboard Top R&B Singles chart. The song has been frequently covered, with the most notable cover being a 1970 version by Al Green, a slower-paced version without multi-lead vocals. Green's cover, the title track of his 1971 LP Al Green Gets Next to You, reached No. 60 on the Billboard Hot 100, and No. 11 on the R&B chart.

Personnel
 Lead and background vocals by Dennis Edwards (verses; choruses; outro), Eddie Kendricks (verses; choruses), Paul Williams (verses), Melvin Franklin (verses), and Otis Williams (last verse)
 Written by Norman Whitfield and Barrett Strong
 Produced by Norman Whitfield
 Instrumentation by the Funk Brothers.

Chart history

The Temptations

Year-end charts

All-time charts

Al Green

See also
Hot 100 No. 1 Hits of 1969 (USA)
R&B number-one hits of 1969 (USA)

References

1969 singles
1970 singles
Songs written by Barrett Strong
Songs written by Norman Whitfield
The Temptations songs
The Osmonds songs
Song recordings produced by Norman Whitfield
Billboard Hot 100 number-one singles
Psychedelic soul songs
1969 songs
Gordy Records singles
Hi Records singles